Alexandra Johnes (born December 3, 1976) is an American documentary film producer and former actress.  As a producer, Johnes is known for films including The Square, Gonzo: The Life and Work of Dr. Hunter S. Thompson, and Doubletime.  She has worked as a Producer with various directors, including Alex Gibney, Eugene Jarecki and Jehane Noujaim.   In 2013, Johnes received a Primetime Emmy Award for producing Mea Maxima Culpa: Silence in the House of God.  During her acting career, Johnes' film credits include starring roles as the Childlike Empress in The NeverEnding Story II: The Next Chapter, and Phoebe in Zelly and Me, alongside Isabella Rossellini and David Lynch, as well as guest appearances on Buffy the Vampire Slayer and Sabrina, the Teenage Witch.

Biography
Johnes graduated with a BFA from the Tisch School of the Arts at New York University (NYU). From 2007 through 2012, Johnes ran Jigsaw Productions for Academy Award-winning director Alex Gibney, managing aspects of development and production. In 2012, Johnes received a Transatlantic Partnership (TAP) Producing Fellowship  from the Independent Filmmaker Project.

Johnes leads the production company Special Projects.

Johnes' sister Stephanie Johnes also works in film. Stephanie directed and filmed the 2007 documentary Doubletime, on which Alexandra worked as a producer.

Filmography

Producer

Actor

Awards and nominations

References

External links
 
 "Dov Charney’s American Dream", 2017 Gerald Loeb Award winner for Audio

Living people
American film producers
American child actresses
Tisch School of the Arts alumni
Place of birth missing (living people)
American women film producers
Gerald Loeb Award winners for Audio and Video
1976 births